In mathematics, more specifically in the field of group theory, a solvable group or soluble group is a group that can be constructed from abelian groups using extensions.  Equivalently, a solvable group is a group whose derived series terminates in the trivial subgroup.

Motivation 
Historically, the word "solvable" arose from Galois theory and the proof of the general unsolvability of quintic equation. Specifically, a polynomial equation is solvable in radicals if and only if the corresponding Galois group is solvable (note this theorem holds only in characteristic 0). This means associated to a polynomial  there is a tower of field extensionssuch that

  where , so  is a solution to the equation  where 
  contains a splitting field for

Example 
For example, the smallest Galois field extension of  containing the elementgives a solvable group.

Definition
A group G is called solvable if it has a subnormal series whose factor groups (quotient groups) are all abelian, that is, if there are subgroups 1 = G0 < G1 < ⋅⋅⋅ < Gk = G such that Gj−1 is normal in Gj, and Gj /Gj−1 is an abelian group, for j = 1, 2, …, k.

Or equivalently, if its derived series, the descending normal series

where every subgroup is the commutator subgroup of the previous one, eventually reaches the trivial subgroup of G. These two definitions are equivalent, since for every group H and every normal subgroup N of H, the quotient H/N is abelian if and only if N includes the commutator subgroup of H. The least n such that G(n) = 1 is called the derived length of the solvable group G.

For finite groups, an equivalent definition is that a solvable group is a group with a composition series all of whose factors are cyclic groups of prime order. This is equivalent because a finite group has finite composition length, and every simple abelian group is cyclic of prime order. The Jordan–Hölder theorem guarantees that if one composition series has this property, then all composition series will have this property as well. For the Galois group of a polynomial, these cyclic groups correspond to nth roots (radicals) over some field. The equivalence does not necessarily hold for infinite groups: for example, since every nontrivial subgroup of the group Z of integers under addition is isomorphic to Z itself, it has no composition series, but the normal series {0, Z}, with its only factor group isomorphic to Z, proves that it is in fact solvable.

Examples

Abelian groups 
The basic example of solvable groups are abelian groups. They are trivially solvable since a subnormal series is formed by just the group itself and the trivial group. But non-abelian groups may or may not be solvable.

Nilpotent groups 
More generally, all nilpotent groups are solvable. In particular, finite p-groups are solvable, as all finite p-groups are nilpotent.

Quaternion groups 

Group extensions 
Group extensions form the prototypical examples of solvable groups. In fact, all solvable groups can be formed from such group extensions.

Nonabelian group which is non-nilpotent 
A small example of a solvable, non-nilpotent group is the symmetric group S3. In fact, as the smallest simple non-abelian group is A5, (the alternating group of degree 5) it follows that every group with order less than 60 is solvable.

Finite groups of odd order 
The Feit–Thompson theorem states that every finite group of odd order is solvable. In particular this implies that if a finite group is simple, it is either a prime cyclic or of even order.

Non-example 
The group S5 is not solvable — it has a composition series {E, A5, S5} (and the Jordan–Hölder theorem states that every other composition series is equivalent to that one), giving factor groups isomorphic to A5 and C2; and A5 is not abelian. Generalizing this argument, coupled with the fact that An is a normal, maximal, non-abelian simple subgroup of Sn for n > 4, we see that Sn is not solvable for n > 4. This is a key step in the proof that for every n > 4 there are polynomials of degree n which are not solvable by radicals (Abel–Ruffini theorem). This property is also used in complexity theory in the proof of Barrington's theorem.

Subgroups of GL2 
Consider the subgroups of for some field . SoNote the determinant condition on  implies , hence  is a subgroup (which are the matrices where ). For fixed , the linear equation  implies , which is an arbitrary element in  since . This shows the quotient group .

Remark 
This implies . Also, a matrix of the formcorresponds to the element  in the group.

Borel subgroups 

Borel subgroup in GL3 
In  there are the subgroupsNotice , hence the Borel group has the form

Borel subgroup in product of simple linear algebraic groups 

Z-groups 
Any finite group whose p-Sylow subgroups are cyclic is a semidirect product of two cyclic groups, in particular solvable.  Such groups are called Z-groups.

OEIS values 
Numbers of solvable groups with order n are (start with n = 0)
0, 1, 1, 1, 2, 1, 2, 1, 5, 2, 2, 1, 5, 1, 2, 1, 14, 1, 5, 1, 5, 2, 2, 1, 15, 2, 2, 5, 4, 1, 4, 1, 51, 1, 2, 1, 14, 1, 2, 2, 14, 1, 6, 1, 4, 2, 2, 1, 52, 2, 5, 1, 5, 1, 15, 2, 13, 2, 2, 1, 12, 1, 2, 4, 267, 1, 4, 1, 5, 1, 4, 1, 50, ... 

Orders of non-solvable groups are
60, 120, 168, 180, 240, 300, 336, 360, 420, 480, 504, 540, 600, 660, 672, 720, 780, 840, 900, 960, 1008, 1020, 1080, 1092, 1140, 1176, 1200, 1260, 1320, 1344, 1380, 1440, 1500, ...

Properties 

Solvability is closed under a number of operations.

 If G is solvable, and H is a subgroup of G, then H is solvable.
 If G is solvable, and there is a homomorphism from G onto H, then H is solvable; equivalently (by the first isomorphism theorem), if G is solvable, and N is a normal subgroup of G, then G/N is solvable.
 The previous properties can be expanded into the following "three for the price of two" property: G is solvable if and only if both N and G/N are solvable.
 In particular, if G and H are solvable, the direct product G × H is solvable.

Solvability is closed under group extension:
 If H and G/H are solvable, then so is G; in particular, if N and H are solvable, their semidirect product is also solvable.

It is also closed under wreath product:
 If G and H are solvable, and X is a G-set, then the wreath product of G and H with respect to X is also solvable.

For any positive integer N, the solvable groups of derived length at most N form a subvariety of the variety of groups, as they are closed under the taking of homomorphic images, subalgebras, and (direct) products.  The direct product of a sequence of solvable groups with unbounded derived length is not solvable, so the class of all solvable groups is not a variety.

Burnside's theorem

Burnside's theorem states that if G  is a finite group of order paqb where p and q are prime numbers, and a and b  are non-negative integers, then G is solvable.

Related concepts

Supersolvable groups

As a strengthening of solvability, a group G is called supersolvable (or supersoluble) if it has an invariant normal series whose factors are all cyclic. Since a normal series has finite length by definition, uncountable groups are not supersolvable. In fact, all supersolvable groups are finitely generated, and an abelian group is supersolvable if and only if it is finitely generated. The alternating group A4 is an example of a finite solvable group that is not supersolvable.

If we restrict ourselves to finitely generated groups, we can consider the following arrangement of classes of groups:

cyclic < abelian < nilpotent < supersolvable < polycyclic < solvable < finitely generated group.

Virtually solvable groups
A group G is called virtually solvable if it has a solvable subgroup of finite index.  This is similar to virtually abelian.  Clearly all solvable groups are virtually solvable, since one can just choose the group itself, which has index 1.

Hypoabelian
A solvable group is one whose derived series reaches the trivial subgroup at a finite stage.  For an infinite group, the finite derived series may not stabilize, but the transfinite derived series always stabilizes.  A group whose transfinite derived series reaches the trivial group is called a hypoabelian group, and every solvable group is a hypoabelian group.  The first ordinal α such that G(α) = G(α+1) is called the (transfinite) derived length of the group G, and it has been shown that every ordinal is the derived length of some group .

See also

 Prosolvable group
Parabolic subgroup

Notes

References

External links
 
Solvable groups as iterated extensions

 
Properties of groups